Víctor Guadalupe Torres Chávez (born 27 August 1995) is a Mexican footballer.

References

External links

1995 births
Living people
Mexican footballers
Association football defenders
Dorados de Sinaloa footballers
Club Tijuana footballers
Ascenso MX players
Liga Premier de México players
Sportspeople from Culiacán
Footballers from Sinaloa